Crumley may refer to:

Bob Crumley (1876–1949), Scottish professional footballer
James Crumley (1939–2008), American author
James Crumley (footballer) (1890–1981), Scottish footballer
Jim Crumley (Scottish author) (born 1947), Scottish journalist
Patrick Crumley (1860–1922), Irish Nationalist UK Member of the Parliament
Tyler Crumley (born 2007), American actor

See also
Crumley Chapel, Alabama, unincorporated community in Jefferson County, Alabama
Crumley-Lynn-Lodge House, historic home near Winchester, Frederick County, Virginia
Crum (disambiguation)
Crumbley